Richland Creek is a  long 2nd order tributary to South Hyco Creek in Person County, North Carolina.  Richland Creek joins South Hyco Creek within Hyco Lake.

Variant names
According to the Geographic Names Information System, it has also been known historically as:
Richard Creek

Course
Richland Creek rises in a pond about 0.25 miles northeast of Roseville, North Carolina and then flows northwest to join South Hyco Creek about 3 miles southwest of Concord.

Watershed
Richland Creek drains  of area, receives about 46.5 in/year of precipitation, has a wetness index of 410.23, and is about 49% forested.

References

Rivers of North Carolina
Rivers of Person County, North Carolina
Tributaries of the Roanoke River